The canton of Le Val du Dropt is an administrative division of the Lot-et-Garonne department, southwestern France. It was created at the French canton reorganisation which came into effect in March 2015. Its seat is in Miramont-de-Guyenne.

It consists of the following communes:
 
Agnac
Allemans-du-Dropt
Armillac
Bourgougnague
Cahuzac
Castillonnès
Cavarc
Douzains
Ferrensac
Lalandusse
Laperche
Lauzun
Lavergne
Lougratte
Miramont-de-Guyenne
Montauriol
Montignac-de-Lauzun
Peyrière
Puysserampion
Roumagne
Saint-Colomb-de-Lauzun
Saint-Pardoux-Isaac
Saint-Quentin-du-Dropt
Ségalas
Sérignac-Péboudou

References

Cantons of Lot-et-Garonne